Siegbert Alber (27 July 1936 - 4 June 2021) was a German politician of the Christian Democratic Union (CDU) and former member of the German Bundestag.

Life 
Alber was a member of the CDU. He was active in the youth organization Junge Union as district, county and state chairman. From 1971 to 1980 he was chairman of the CDU district association in Stuttgart, which subsequently elected him honorary chairman. From 1969 to 1980, he was a member of the CDU in the German Bundestag for three legislative periods for Baden-Württemberg and a member of the European Parliament from 1977 to 1997. From 1984 to 1992 he was Vice-President of the CDU, having previously been Vice-Chairman of the EPP Group since 1982.

Literature

References

1936 births
2021 deaths
People from Hechingen
Members of the Bundestag for Baden-Württemberg
Members of the Bundestag 1976–1980
Members of the Bundestag 1972–1976
Members of the Bundestag 1969–1972
Members of the Bundestag for the Christian Democratic Union of Germany
Commanders Crosses of the Order of Merit of the Federal Republic of Germany
Recipients of the Order of Merit of Baden-Württemberg